is a Japanese actress represented by the talent agency Oscar Promotion.

Biography
In November 2011, Koshiba won the Grand Prix award at the 2011 Ion and Oscar Promotion Girl Audition.

In 2012, she debuted in the drama Iki mo Dekinai Natsu.

In 2014, Koshiba was cast as leading role for the first time with Kiki's Delivery Service. She was awarded the Best Newcomer Award at the 57th Blue Ribbon Awards and 24th Japanese Movie Critics Awards for her acting in this film.

Filmography

TV series

Films

Dubbing
The Nutcracker and the Four Realms as Clara Stahlbaum (Mackenzie Foy)

References

External links
 
Official profile 

1997 births
Living people
Actresses from Osaka Prefecture
People from Sakai, Osaka